Kiryat HaYovel is a neighborhood in southwestern Jerusalem on Mount Herzl. It was built in the early 1950s to house new immigrants. Today, Kiryat HaYovel has a population of 25,000 residents.

Kiryat HaYovel is located on the main road to Hadassah Hospital, Ein Kerem, between Ramat Denya and Kiryat Menachem.

History

Kiryat HaYovel was established in 1952 to house thousands of Jews from Arab countries who fled their homes when the State of Israel was declared. In the early days it was a tent city, as public housing projects, called shikunim, were hastily built to accommodate them. Kiryat HaYovel was built on the land of the Palestinian village Beit Mazmil that was occupied during the Israeli-Arab war of 1948. It was renamed Kiryat Hayovel  (Jubilee Town) to commemorate the fiftieth anniversary of the Jewish National Fund.

The need for housing was so urgent that a British mandatory ordinance requiring that all buildings in Jerusalem be faced with Jerusalem stone was waived in Kiryat Hayovel. Functional architecture, with flat roofs, stucco facades and no ornamentation, was characteristic of early construction in the neighborhood, and many examples remain until today.

Demographics
The neighborhood's immigrant population was gradually supplemented with young couples. In the 1960s, they were joined by teachers and professors, offsetting the proletarian character of the neighborhood and creating more upscale sections, such as the large private homes lining Shmaryahu Levin Street. In 2002, it was described as a  blue-collar neighborhood.

Terrorist incident

On March 29, 2002, Ayat al-Akhras, an 18-year-old Palestinian, blew herself up at the entrance of Kiryat HaYovel's main supermarket, killing two people and injuring 28.

Culture

Kiryat HaYovel has a commercial center, a community center, three public swimming pools, and a library.

The neighborhood's claim to fame is "The Golem", a whimsical playground sculpture set in Rabinovich Park. Commonly called "The Monster" (Hamifletzet in Hebrew), the sculpture's three red tongues serve as slides. The Golem was designed by the French sculptor Niki de Saint-Phalle.

Many of the streets in Kiryat HaYovel are named for countries in Latin America, whose United Nations representatives voted in favor of the establishment of Israel in 1947.

Hospitals
ALYN Hospital, a comprehensive rehabilitation center for physically challenged and disabled children, adolescents, and young adults, is located in Kiryat HaYovel.

Notable residents
 Teddy Kollek, Mayor of Jerusalem from 1965 to 1993

 Eli Ohana, soccer player

External links

 Short fundraiser filmed in the neighborhood in the 1950s
 Kiryat HaYovel WebSite 
 Jerusalem WebSite on Kiryat HaYovel

References

Neighbourhoods of Jerusalem